Jorge Pérez (born 7 September 1961) is a Spanish former alpine skier who competed in the 1980 Winter Olympics and in the 1984 Winter Olympics.

See also
Skiing sport in Spain

References

1961 births
Living people
Spanish male alpine skiers
Olympic alpine skiers of Spain
Alpine skiers at the 1980 Winter Olympics
Alpine skiers at the 1984 Winter Olympics
20th-century Spanish people